The list of shipwrecks in August 1821 includes ships sunk, wrecked or otherwise lost during August 1821.

2 August

8 August

9 August

10 August

11 August

12 August

14 August

15 August

16 August

19 August

21 August

23 August

26 August

27 August

28 August

30 August

Unknown date

References

1821-08